Six Way is an unincorporated community in Morgan County, Alabama, United States.

References

Unincorporated communities in Morgan County, Alabama
Unincorporated communities in Alabama